A Tale of Love and Desire is a 2021 Tunisian drama film directed by Leyla Bouzid and co-produced by Sandra da Fonseca and Olivier Père. The film revolves around a erotic Arabian love affair between Ahmed, a 18-year old, French of Algerian origin, and Farah, a young Tunisian girl.

The film made its premiere on 1 September 2021. The film received positive reviews from critics. The film was selected in the official competition for Best feature film and for the Golden Stallion of Yennenga for Best film.

Cast
 Sami Outalbali as Ahmed Ouannas
 Zbeida Belhajamor as Farah Kallel
 Diong-Kéba Tacu as Saidou
 Aurélia Petit as Professeur Anne Morel
 Mahia Zrouki as Dalila
 Bellamine Abdelmalek as Karim
 Mathilde Lamusse as Léa
 Samir El Hakim as Hakim
 Khemissa Zarouel as Faouzia
 Sofia Lesaffre as Malika
 Baptiste Carrion-Weiss as Damien
 Charles Poitevin as Garçon rue Mouffetard
 Omar Khasb as Garçon bagarre cité
 Zaineb Bouzid as Chiraz

Reception
In France, the film averages 4/5 on the AlloCiné from 25 press reviews. On review aggregator Rotten Tomatoes, which categorizes reviews as positive or negative only, the film has an approval rating of 100% calculated based on 6 critics comments. By comparison, with the same opinions being calculated using a weighted arithmetic mean, the rating is 6.0/10.

References

External links 
 

Tunisian drama films
2021 films
2021 drama films
French drama films
2020s French films
Films set in Paris